The Trial of Vivienne Ware is a 1932 American pre-Code drama film directed by William K. Howard, written by Barry Conners and Philip Klein, and starring Joan Bennett, Donald Cook, Richard "Skeets" Gallagher, ZaSu Pitts, Lilian Bond and Alan Dinehart. It was released on May 1, 1932, by Fox Film Corporation.

Plot
A wealthy socialite on trial for the murder of her unfaithful fiancee is defended by her ex-boyfriend.

Cast        
Joan Bennett as Vivienne Ware
Donald Cook as John Sutherland
Richard "Skeets" Gallagher as Graham McNally
ZaSu Pitts as Gladys Fairweather
Lilian Bond as Dolores Divine
Alan Dinehart as Prosecutor
Herbert Mundin as William Boggs
Howard Phillips as Minetti aka Joe Garson
William Pawley as Joseph Gilk
Noel Madison as Angelo Paroni
Jameson Thomas as Damon Fenwick
Ruth Selwyn as Mercedes Joy
Christian Rub as Axel Nordstrom
Maude Eburne as Mrs. Elizabeth Hardy
John M. Sullivan as Judge Henderson

References

External links
 
 

1932 films
Fox Film films
American drama films
1932 drama films
Films directed by William K. Howard
American black-and-white films
1930s English-language films
1930s American films